Monte Rua is a mountain in the Euganean Hills of Padua Province, Italy. There is a hermitage located on the mountain's summit. Monte Rua is located in 2 different municipalities, the summit is divided between Galzignano Terme and Torreglia

Mountains of Veneto